The forty-second edition of the Caribbean Series (Serie del Caribe) was held from February 2 through February 8 of  with the champion baseball teams of the Dominican Republic, Águilas Cibaeñas; Mexico, Mayos de Navojoa; Puerto Rico, Cangrejeros de Santurce, and Venezuela, Águilas del Zulia. The format consisted of 12 games, each team facing the other teams twice, and the games were played at Estadio Quisqueya in Santo Domingo, Dominican Republic.

Summary

Final standings

Individual leaders

All-Star team

Sources
Bjarkman, Peter. Diamonds around the Globe: The Encyclopedia of International Baseball. Greenwood. 
Serie del Caribe : History, Records and Statistics (Spanish)
Estadísticas Serie del Caribe 2000 (Spanish)

Caribbean
2000
February 2000 sports events in North America
International baseball competitions hosted by the Dominican Republic
2000 in Caribbean sport
2000 in Dominican Republic sport
20th century in Santo Domingo